Dražíč is a municipality and village in České Budějovice District in the South Bohemian Region of the Czech Republic. It has about 300 inhabitants.

Administrative parts
Villages of Březí, Karlov-Nepomuk and Vranov are administrative parts of Dražíč.

References

Villages in České Budějovice District